"The Quiet Place" is a song by Swedish heavy metal band In Flames. It was released in 2004, as the first single from their album Soundtrack to Your Escape. It is the third single overall in the band's career. The single is the band's most successful in their home country of Sweden, peaking at no. 2 on the Swedish Singles chart. 

The remix of "My Sweet Shadow" was done by Örjan Örnkloo. The song "Värmlandsvisan" is a cover of the Swedish folk song "Dear Old Stockholm".

Track listing

Music video
The song "The Quiet Place" also featured a video, directed by Patrick Ullaeus. Featuring Ullaeus' camera angles and saturated colors, the video features a story of lead singer Anders Fridén going to see a movie, falling asleep in the theater and, as the band members put it, "waking up in his own head".

Charts

Personnel
In Flames
Anders Fridén – vocals
Jesper Strömblad – guitar
Björn Gelotte – guitar
Peter Iwers – bass guitar
Daniel Svensson – drums

References

2004 singles
2004 songs
In Flames songs
Songs written by Jesper Strömblad
Nuclear Blast Records singles